Nick Eyles has been Professor of Geology at the University of Toronto since 1982.

He graduated from Memorial University of Newfoundland with an MSc and complteded his PhD at the University of East Anglia in 1978. He was awarded the McNeil Medal of the Royal Society of Canada in 2013 and the E. R. Ward Neale Medal by the Geological Association of Canada in 2015.

References

Year of birth missing (living people)
Living people
Memorial University of Newfoundland alumni
Alumni of the University of East Anglia
Academic staff of the University of Toronto Scarborough